Duntroonornis parvus, also referred to as the Duntroon penguin, is a genus and species of extinct penguin from the Late Oligocene of New Zealand. The penguin was relatively small, similar in size to the Fiordland crested penguin. It was described by Brian Marples in 1952 from fossil material (a left tarsometatarsus) collected near Duntroon, from the Kokoamu Greensand Formation, near the border between the Canterbury and Otago regions of the South Island. Fossils found at the Hakataramea Valley may also be referrable to this species. The genus name Duntroonornis means "Duntroon bird". The specific epithet is the Latin parvus ("small").

References

Spheniscidae
Oligocene birds
Extinct birds of New Zealand
Extinct monotypic bird genera
Extinct penguins
Prehistoric bird genera
Taxa named by Brian John Marples